Samuel Stokely (January 25, 1796 – May 23, 1861) was an American lawyer and politician who served one term as a U.S. Representative from Ohio from 1841 to 1843.

Biography 
Born in Washington, Pennsylvania, Stokely attended private schools.
He was graduated from Washington College (now Washington and Jefferson College), Washington, Pennsylvania, in 1813.
He studied law.
He was admitted to the bar and commenced practice in Steubenville, Ohio, in 1817.
He was United States land receiver 1821–1833. He served as a member of the State senate in 1837 and 1838.

Stokely was elected as a Whig to the Twenty-seventh Congress (March 4, 1841 – March 3, 1843).
He resumed the practice of law in Steubenville, where he died May 23, 1861.
He was interred in Union Cemetery.

In April 1830, he married Rachel Mason. He purchased the Bezaleel Wells homestead, The Grove, at a sheriff's sale, and he and his descendants lived there for sixty years. He was a general in the militia, and also married and was survived Mrs. Lowther and Mrs. Burton. He had four children.

References

External links 
 

1796 births
1861 deaths
Washington & Jefferson College alumni
Politicians from Steubenville, Ohio
People from Washington County, Pennsylvania
Ohio state senators
Burials at Union Cemetery-Beatty Park
American militia generals
Whig Party members of the United States House of Representatives from Ohio
19th-century American politicians
Military personnel from Pennsylvania